Glenlossie distillery is a single malt whisky distillery in Elgin, Morayshire in Scotland.

History 
The Glenlossie distillery was founded in 1876, by John Duff.

 In 1919, the distillery was bought over by Distillers Company Ltd.
 In 1929, the distillery was destroyed by a fire but it was quickly rebuild.
 The distillery was closed during the first and second world wars.
 In 1962, it increased from 4 to 6 stills.
 in 1990, Glenlossie 10 year old was launched.

See also 
 Speyside Single Malts
 Whisky
 Scotch whisky
 List of whisky brands
 List of distilleries in Scotland

References 

Scottish malt whisky
Distilleries in Scotland
1876 establishments in Scotland